Arnold Sidebottom (born 1 April 1954) is an English former footballer and cricketer, who played cricket for Yorkshire and played one Test match for England.

Football
Sidebottom was born in Shawlands, Barnsley, Yorkshire, and started off as a professional footballer, playing as a central defender. He joined Manchester United as an amateur in January 1971, and turned professional in 1972. He replaced the injured Jim Holton during the 1974–75 season in the Second Division. He helped United win the Second Division Championship in that season, but was transferred in January 1976 to Huddersfield Town, after making 20 appearances for United. He later played for Halifax Town.

In 2007, he was voted in at Number 5 in The Times poll of the "50 Worst footballers (to grace the top division)".

Cricket
Sidebottom also had a cricketing career, and first played for Yorkshire in 1973, but did not win his county cap until 1980. The county's fortunes on the field were adversely affected during his career by in-fighting and by its own regulations, which prevented the fielding of players born from outside of the county; the county only signed its first overseas-born player (Sachin Tendulkar) as Sidebottom's career was coming to an end. A rare highlight came in 1987 when the county won the limited-over Benson and Hedges Cup, Sidebottom being at the wicket in the final as the win was secured.

Test match cricket seemed to have passed him by when he went to South Africa as part of the rebel tour led by Graham Gooch in 1982, which also earned him a three-year Test ban. He also played for Orange Free State. After the ban ended, he was a surprise call up for the Trent Bridge Test in 1985 against Australia, where he took 1 for 65 before limping off injured. His only wicket was that of Bob Holland. Sidebottom himself admitted that his Test selection came when he was past his prime.

Coaching career
Sidebottom continued playing for Yorkshire until 1991, and then went into coaching. He finally left Yorkshire in 2003. He now coaches pupils at Woodhouse Grove School, West Yorkshire, in football and cricket, as well as coaching young cricketers at Thongsbridge Cricket Club and the Ryan Sidebottom Cricket Academy.

Personal life
Sidebottom's son, Ryan, is also a professional cricketer. A left-arm fast bowler, he has played cricket for both Yorkshire and Nottinghamshire, and has also represented England in both Tests and One Day Internationals. He retired from international cricket in September 2010 and domestic cricket in 2017.

See also
One Test Wonder

References

External links
 
 

1954 births
Living people
Cricketers from Barnsley
England Test cricketers
English cricketers
English footballers
English Football League players
Association football defenders
Free State cricketers
Halifax Town A.F.C. players
Huddersfield Town A.F.C. players
Manchester United F.C. players
Yorkshire cricketers
Marylebone Cricket Club cricketers
D. B. Close's XI cricketers
English cricketers of 1969 to 2000